Randolph-Henry High School is the only high school located in Charlotte County, Virginia, enrolling approximately 680 students (2008-2009) according to the Randolph-Henry guidance department.  The high school has been recognized by numerous sources as a high standard achieving rural high school, and is led by administrators, Mrs. Erin Davis, Principal; Mr. Chris Holt and Mrs. Rebecca Saunders, Assistant Principals; and Mr. Chris Holt, Athletic Director.  Notable aspects of the school include the school agricultural farm, on which students in Agriculture classes "work", as well as Statesmen Computers, a company that provides computers to colleges and universities throughout Virginia; these computers are built and distributed by students as well.

History
The school is named after John Randolph and Patrick Henry, patriots of the Revolutionary era who had a debate in Charlotte Court House, one mile to the east.  It was established in 1938 with the help of former ambassador David K. E. Bruce. The school has a World War II memorial plaque in honor of its students who fought for their country, a commitment to freedom few remaining high schools can boast.

Athletics
Randolph-Henry is classified as a Double A school by the Virginia High School League and is part of the A James River District and A Region B.  Their mascot, the Statesmen was inspired by the patriotism of the country's early leaders, such as John Randolph and Patrick Henry, for whom the school is named.  The school's baseball team has won two state championships in 2002 and 2005 and has won the Regional Championship eight times. Over fifty former baseball players from Randolph-Henry have gone on to play college in the past 40 years. Over that span of time, three coaches (Dick Bankston, Donnie Reebals and Billy Catron) combined to produce over 600 Varsity victories. The school's golf team, coached by Kelly Powell, is one of the best in the state, winning the state in 2005.  They also placed third in the state in 2006, and second in the state in 2016.  The varsity boys tennis team, coached by Kenny Howard, is also extremely talented, winning the A James River District for seven consecutive years, and being the A Region B runners-up during each of those years.  In 2007, Zack Pack became the A State Boys' Tennis Singles Champion, following three years of being the Region B runner-up.  Chris Boyd won the State Title for Randolph-Henry as a Junior in the 215 division of wrestling.

Three Randolph-Henry athletes have signed with NCAA Division I football teams since 2000:  John McCargo and Ryan Hathaway.  John McCargo of Drakes Branch, VA signed with the North Carolina State Wolfpack in 2002.  After being a redshirt as a freshman, McCargo played three years with the Wolfpack until entering the NFL draft in 2006 and signing with the Buffalo Bills as a defensive lineman.  Ryan Hathaway of Keysville, VA signed with Norfolk State University in 2007.
Joe Reed played for University of Virginia from 2016 to 2019 and was listed as a first-team all-ACC player. He was drafted by the Los Angeles Chargers as a fifth round pick in 2020.

Academic teams
Randolph-Henry has several excellent and award-winning academic teams including theatre, forensics, ACE, and yearbook.  The ACE, or Scholastic Bowl team has won the James River District Championship in the All-Around category for six consecutive years, and competed in the State Championship in 2001-2002, and also for the 2008-2009 school year.  The Forensics Team claimed a 14 year James River District Tournament Championship title from 1999-2012.  In addition, the forensics team was VHSL State Champion in 2004 and 2011 and was State Runner up in 2009, 2010, and 2012. The team has had seventeen individual state champions: William Deford (1965), Ann Roger (1965), Brian Gard (1988, 1989 & 1990), William Collins (1992), April Hamilton (2001), Josh Goff (2003), Lewis Tedesco (2004), Sam Catron (2006), Sameera Gadiyaram (2007), Katie Cross (2009), Savannah Ketchum (2010), Mary Margaret Watkins (2010 and 2011), Ryan Larson (2011), Dayton Dunnavant (2011), and Brittany Guill (2011), Josh Lacks (2012).

References

External links
 Charlotte County Public Schools
 Randolph-Henry's official school website

Schools in Charlotte County, Virginia
Educational institutions established in 1938
Public high schools in Virginia
1938 establishments in Virginia